Delhi Public School, Greater Noida also known as DPS, Greater Noida is a K–12 co-ed English-medium school in Gamma II, Greater Noida and Uttar Pradesh, India. The school is affiliated to the Central Board of Secondary Education, New Delhi from class nursery to XII and is one of the core schools of the Delhi Public School Society. The current principal is Ms. Sandhya Awasthi.

History
The school was established in 1998 and Ranjeev Taneja was the founder principal. He is presently the secretary of DPS Society. DPS Greater Noida is divided into three wings: junior, middle and senior school. It has 4900 students (approx.) and 400 faculty members.

Academics
The school follows curriculum designed by the Central Board of Secondary Education. Subjects taught are - English, Hindi, Maths, EVS, Science, Social Science, Sanskrit/French/German/Spanish/Japanese as third language, Physics, Chemistry, Mathematics, Physical Education, Economics, Psychology, Accounts, Business Studies, Information Practices, Entrepreneurship, Political Science, History, Geography. The schools has claimed toppers in CBSE Class XII exams.

Sports
The school hosted the National Inter DPS Multi Sports Meet for Girls (under 19) 2014 from 27 to 29 December 2014. Nearly 600 girls from 47 Delhi Public Schools across the country participated in the event.

The school also hosted the National Level Inter DPS Badminton and Table Tennis Championship 2009 from 24 to 26 July 2009.

The school  hosted the National Inter DPS Athletic Meet (Boys)-2013 from 18 October to 20 October 2013.

Co-curricular activities
A wide range of co-curricular activities are organized to supplement the academic programme, such as Art & Craft club, Music (Vocal and instrumental), Indian and Western Dance, Activity clubs, Quiz club, Taekwondo, Skating, Yoga, Public Speaking, Dramatics, Book club, Best out of waste, Nature club, Cooking without fire, Clay modeling, German Club, Japanese club, Spanish club, English Theater, English Creative Writing, English Debate, Hindi Theater, Hindi Debate, Embroidery and Fabric Painting, Cookery, Environment club and Gardening, Kathak Dance, Science Quiz & Club, Astronomy club, Fashion Designing, Eco projects, Calligraphy club, Robotics club, Cyber club and many more. The school has won many competitions in its recent history in Inter DPS annual festivals and runner up in  Dr PK Khasnavis memorial inter-school debate ('against the motion') organized by DPS Rohini. It also hosted the Inter - DPS Science Fest in 2019.

References

External links 
 

• https://m.timesofindia.com/city/noida/greater-noida-nursery-students-rape-principal-class-teacher-booked/amp_articleshow/65522746.cms

Delhi Public School Society
Primary schools in Uttar Pradesh
High schools and secondary schools in Uttar Pradesh
Schools in Noida
Educational institutions established in 1998
1998 establishments in Uttar Pradesh